Erythrolamprus albiventris is a species of snake in the family Colubridae. The species is found in  Ecuador and Colombia.

References

Erythrolamprus
Reptiles of Ecuador
Reptiles of Colombia
Reptiles described in 1863
Taxa named by Giorgio Jan